Orion You Came and You Took All My Marbles is a 2010 mystery novel by Kira Henehan. It was nominated for the Believer Book Award.

The novel is a mystery, and concerns a detective, Finley, who is investigating a puppet troupe led by a Professor Uppal.

References

2010 American novels
2010 debut novels
American mystery novels
Milkweed Editions books